Eric Taslitz is an American actor best known for roles in such films and television series as American Pop, Galactica 1980, and Lambada.

Filmography

References

External links

Living people
American male film actors
American male television actors
1966 births